Angel's Bite (Ujed anđela) is a 1984 Yugoslav film directed by Lordan Zafranović.

Sources

External links
 

1984 films
Croatian drama films
1980s Croatian-language films
Yugoslav drama films
Films set on islands